Edward Nicholas Cole (September 17, 1909 – May 2, 1977) was an American automotive executive for General Motors.

Career 
Cole was the son of a dairy farmer. In his youth, he designed, built, and sold homemade radio sets, and as a teenager became a field representative for a tractor manufacturer. He wanted to be a lawyer, but landed a part-time job in an auto parts store while attending Grand Rapids Community College. He then enrolled in General Motors Institute, where he was a member of the Phi Kappa Epsilon (now Pi Kappa Alpha) Fraternity. Soon after Cole married his hometown sweetheart, Esther Engman. He worked in engineering, rising to co-head a team (with Harry Barr) that developed the 1949 Cadillac V8. He was briefly assigned to run a GM plant in Cleveland, Ohio, when Chevrolet general manager Tom Keating requested his assignment as chief engineer.

He became chief engineer of the Chevrolet Division in 1952. His most important task was to develop a new engine for Chevy's lineup to replace the Stovebolt Six; that new engine was Chevrolet's small-block V8, a massive success that remained in production for decades. He collaborated with Zora Arkus-Duntov to revitalize the weak-performing early Corvettes, and he also introduced engineering and design advancements in the Chevrolet car and truck lines between 1955 and 1962.

Cole was promoted to general manager of Chevrolet in 1956. During these years, Chevy was a perennial sales leader, but with only larger cars in the lineup. As general manager of Chevrolet, he directed the development of the Corvair intended to pursue the compact car market. The strong early sales of the new car with its radical design with rear-engine, rear-wheel drive layout, put Cole on the cover of Time magazine October 5, 1959 issue. Cole was promoted to head the GM car and truck group in 1961, then to executive vice-president in 1965, and to president in 1967.

Cole was chief engineer of  the Chevrolet Vega and directed the GM design staff in developing their first subcompact, four passenger vehicle. Cole's persistence in getting his advanced engineering projects to the production line resulted in the innovative aluminum engines in both the Corvair and Vega. He "would preside over Vega's troubled launch, which was intertwined with a disastrous 1970 confrontation between GM and the United Auto Workers." Ironically, Cole's greatest engineering triumph came the same year. Cole ordered engine compression ratios reduced after 1970 knowing regulations would tighten. Cole oversaw the transition away from leaded gasoline and prepared GM for catalytic converters in 1975.

Cole retired from GM in 1974. He then became chairman and CEO of Checker Motors Corporation and Chairman of International Husky, an air-freight company. In 1977, the Rifle River Scout Canoe Base was renamed the Edward N. Cole Canoe Base to reflect the dedication of Edward N. Cole to Scouting in the Detroit Area. He died at age 67 in a crash during a storm. Cole became a member of Michigan Gamma Chapter of the Tau Beta Pi Engineering Honor Society in 1952. In 1998, Cole was posthumously inducted into the Corvette Hall of Fame.

His son, David E. Cole, is Chairman Emeritus of the Center for Automotive Research (CAR) in Ann Arbor, Michigan.

He was inducted into the Automotive Hall of Fame in 1977. Cole is featured in the History Channel docudrama The Cars That Made America.

References

1909 births
1977 deaths
American automotive engineers
Kettering University alumni
Aviators killed in aviation accidents or incidents in the United States
Accidental deaths in Michigan
General Motors former executives
American automotive pioneers
Grand Rapids Community College alumni
People from Ottawa County, Michigan
20th-century American engineers
Victims of aviation accidents or incidents in 1977